Oxylides bella is a butterfly in the family Lycaenidae. It is found in the Democratic Republic of the Congo.
It is very close to Oxylides faunus differing in that the hindwing beneath at the anal angle between the anal spots and the distal transverse line in the areas 1 b to 2 is extensively suffused with yellow. The discal line beneath from the costal margin of the forewing to vein 3 of the hindwing black, behind it yellow.

References

Butterflies described in 1899
Theclinae
Butterflies of Africa
Taxa named by Per Olof Christopher Aurivillius
Endemic fauna of the Democratic Republic of the Congo